The 1967–68 DDR-Oberliga was the 19th season of the DDR-Oberliga, the first tier of league football in East Germany.

The league was contested by fourteen teams. FC Carl Zeiss Jena won the championship, the club's second of three East German championships, having previously won the 1962–63 edition under the name of SC Motor Jena.

Gerd Kostmann of F.C. Hansa Rostock was the league's top scorer with 15 goals, while Bernd Bransch of Hallescher FC Chemie won the seasons East German Footballer of the year award.

On the strength of the 1967–68 title Jena qualified for the 1968–69 European Cup where the club was drawn against Red Star Belgrade in the first round but withdrew after a redraw following the events of the Prague Spring. UEFA had drawn all Eastern European teams against each other to avoid a possible boycott by Western European clubs which, in turn, resulted in a boycott by the clubs from the Soviet Union, Poland, East Germany, Hungary and Bulgaria. Eighth-placed club 1. FC Union Berlin qualified for the 1968–69 European Cup Winners' Cup as the seasons FDGB-Pokal winner but withdrew for the same reasons. Fifth-placed 1. FC Lokomotive Leipzig qualified for the 1968–69 Inter-Cities Fairs Cup, a non-UEFA competition, where it was knocked out in the second round by Hibernian F.C. while second-placed F.C. Hansa Rostock was knocked out by Fiorentina, also in the second round.

Towards the end of the season BSG Motor Zwickau was renamed to BSG Sachsenring Zwickau, Sachsenring being both a race track and a car manufacturer in East Germany.

Table									
The 1967–68 season saw two newly promoted clubs 1. FC Magdeburg and FC Rot-Weiss Erfurt.

Results

References

Sources

External links
 Das Deutsche Fussball Archiv  Historic German league tables

1967-68
1
Ober